Carex magellanica subsp. irrigua is a perennial species of plants in the family Cyperaceae native to Holarctic wetlands. Common names include poor sedge, bog sedge and boreal bog sedge.

magellanica subsp. irrigua
Plants described in 1803
Plant subspecies